Juan de los Santos Contreras; April 7, 1928 – December 10, 2002), was a Venezuelan singer. He was a  llanero, specialising in the music of the Orinoco floodplains. He was better known by his stage name El Carrao de Palmarito which identifies him as the "limpkin" (a bird with a piercing call; Spanish: Carrao, Latin: Aramus guarauna) of Palmarito, his hometown.

He became well known in the 1950s, making radio broadcasts and releasing his first disc on the Velvet label.
His most famous songs include the duet Florentino y el Diablo (based on the poema by Alberto Arvelo Torrealba), Aquella mujer que amé, Furia, Chaparralito llanero, Cajón del Arauca apureño, Llanura yo soy tu hijo, Plegaria llanera, Travesía de San Camilo, Faenas del llano, Dulce María, Mis retoños, El morrocoy de doña Carmen, Caminito de Arichuna, Recorriendo a Barinas, Los martirios del Carrao, El sueño de Julio Verne, Villavicencio. Contreras received many awards, including Venezuela's National Prize of Popular Culture in 1998.

References

  

1928 births
2002 deaths
Venezuelan composers
Male composers
Venezuelan folk singers
20th-century Venezuelan  male singers
20th-century composers
People from Apure